Duncan MacInnes   (1897 – 9 August 1970) was a Scottish Anglican bishop in the 20th century.

Biography
MacInnes was educated at Edinburgh Theological College and ordained in 1927. He began his ordained ministry with a curacy at St Columba's Clydebank, after which he was curate in charge of Knightswood. He was a chaplain to the British Armed Forces during World War II and then Dean of Argyll and The Isles. In 1953 he became the Bishop of Moray, Ross and Caithness, a post he held until his death in 1970. The eleven bells of Inverness Cathedral were restored as a memorial to Bishop Macinnes.

References

20th-century Scottish Episcopalian bishops
Members of the Order of the British Empire
Recipients of the Military Cross
Deans of Argyll and The Isles
Bishops of Moray, Ross and Caithness
1897 births
1970 deaths
Scottish military chaplains
World War II chaplains
Date of birth missing
Alumni of Edinburgh Theological College